Covergirl is a cover album and the debut studio album of Jared Louche and The Aliens, released on September 28, 1999 by Invisible Records. It contains cover versions of some of Louche's favorite musical acts and influences.

Reception

Tom Schulte of AllMusic credits the lounge and jazz influenced material, such as Chemlab's "Suicide Jag" and Frank Sinatra's "Summer Wind", as being the high point of the album. Alex Steininger of In Music We Trust called the album a "a powerful, seductive breath of life that will allow you to never look at the originals in the same light again." In writing for Ink 19, critic Matthew Moyer commended Jared Louche for expanding variety in his musical craft while remaining true to his aesthetic. Despite criticizing some song choices as being lackluster, Chris Best of Lollipop Magazine was mostly positive in his review and said "these selections are reinterpretations that are done well enough to not invoke the originals."

Track listing

Personnel
Adapted from the Covergirl liner notes.

Musicians
 Chris Greene – instruments, programming (2-8, 10), production (2, 4, 5-8, 10)
 Jared Louche – lead vocals, orchestration, conductor, production, programming (2-8, 10)

Additional performers
 DJ Abel (as Kick the Cat) – instruments (5, 8)
 Martin Atkins – programming and production (3, 4, 7, 8)
 Dave Baker – acoustic guitar and production (4)
 J. F. Coleman – programming and production (1)
 Martin King – programming and production (9)
 Bradley McCarty – drums (7)
 Jason McNinch – guitar (2, 3, 7, 8, 10), production (2)
 Pedro Miras (as Kick the Cat) – instruments (5, 8)
 Patrick Skinner – bass guitar (10)
 Alberto Tapia (as Kick the Cat) – instruments (5, 8)

Production and design
 Jill Birschbach – photography
 Marc Paez – design
 Maja Prausnitz – design

Release history

References

External links 
 Covergirl at iTunes
 Covergirl at Discogs (list of releases)

1999 debut albums
Covers albums
Invisible Records albums
Albums produced by Jared Louche